San Justo is a city in the center region of the province of Santa Fe, Argentina, 99 km north from the provincial capital.

Founded in 1868 by Mariano Cabal, San Justo attained the status of a comuna (commune) on 13 July 1887 and the following year the Ferrocarril Provincial de Santa Fe arrived on 1 September 1888. It became a city on 17 September 1959. On January 10, 1973, the city was struck by a destructive tornado.

References
 
 

Populated places in Santa Fe Province